There were elections in 1941 to the United States House of Representatives:

 
1941